Joseph Badeaux (25 September 1777 – 12 September 1835) was the son of Jean-Baptiste Badeaux and, in 1792, he began articling to become a notary. His clerkship was with his brother Antoine-Isidore, who, like their father, was of the notarial profession. He was commissioned to practise in 1798. His practice quickly became successful and Joseph rose to prominence in his home town of Trois-Rivières and also rose through the militia. He was a captain during the War of 1812 and reached the rank of major in 1822.

He was also active in politics and served a number of terms as a member of the Lower Canada House of Assembly starting in 1808.

His second wife, Geneviève, was the daughter of judge Michel-Amable Berthelot Dartigny.

External links 
 

1777 births
1835 deaths
Pre-Confederation Quebec people
Canadian people of the War of 1812
Members of the Legislative Assembly of Lower Canada
Canadian notaries
19th-century Canadian politicians